This is a list of electricity-generating power stations in the U.S. state of South Dakota.  In 2021, South Dakota had a total summer capacity of 4,169 MW through all of its power plants, and a net generation of 17835 GWh.  The corresponding electrical energy generation was 52.3% wind, 29.7% hydroelectric, 9.2% coal and 8.7% natural gas.

During 2021, South Dakota was among the top U.S. states in its share of renewable electricity generation.  It was also among the top states in per-capita consumption.  In recent years, more electricity was consumed than was produced and wind generation has been expanding rapidly in the state.

Nuclear power stations
The Pathfinder Nuclear Generating Station was an early commercial and demonstration plant near Sioux Falls that generated up to 59 MW of grid-connected electricity for brief periods during years 1966–1967. The single BWR reactor was decommissioned in 1967, the facility converted to use oil & gas in 1968, and ultimately retired in the early 2000s.  The reactor and other nuclear components were removed in 1990.  South Dakota had no utility-scale plants that used fissile material as a fuel in 2019.

Fossil-fuel power stations 
Data from the U.S. Energy Information Administration serves as a general reference.

Coal

Natural Gas 

 Waste heat recovery from natural-gas-fired turbines at compressor stations on the Northern Border Pipeline.

Petroleum

Renewable power stations 
Data from the U.S. Energy Information Administration serves as a general reference.

Biomass

Hydroelectric 

Former facilities:
 Johnson Siding Dam - decommissioned 1930's

Solar

Wind 

See also list of farms from the South Dakota Public Utilities Commission.

Storage power stations 
Data from the U.S. Energy Information Administration serves as a general reference.

Battery storage

HVDC converter stations

References

South Dakota
 
Lists of buildings and structures in South Dakota
Energy in South Dakota